Requiem for a Spanish Peasant (Réquiem por un campesino español) is a famous short novel in twentieth-century Spanish literature by Spanish writer Ramón J. Sender. It conveys the thoughts and memories of Mosén Millán, a Catholic parish priest, as he sits in the vestry of a church in a nameless Aragonese village, preparing to conduct a requiem mass to celebrate the life of a young peasant named Paco killed by the Nationalist army a year earlier, at the outbreak of the Spanish Civil War. As he waits, his thoughts are interrupted by the occasional comings and goings of an altar boy, who hums to himself an anonymous ballad.

The novel was originally published under the title Mosén Millán; however, the author changed the title to shift the focus from the priest to its peasant protagonist.

Plot summary 

The story is narrated by a third-person omniscient narrator who has insight into Mosén Millán's thoughts and feelings. Three distinct planes of narration exist in the novel: the present, Millán's recollections of his relationship with Paco from birth to death, and the ballad the altar boy sings which recounts Paco's life.

In the present, Millán, fatigued, prays as he awaits the requiem mass with recollections of Paco's life. As he prays he rests his head against a wall—a habit—which bears a dark spot. The altar boy comes and goes and both remark on the lack of people attending mass. Millán, feeling guilty knowing that he played a role in Paco's death, asks the altar boy to leave the church to look for mass attenders in the town square when the altar boy sings the parts of the ballad that refer to Millán.

Characters 

 Mosén Millán
 The altar boy ('El monaguillo')
 Paco, the young peasant
 Águeda, Paco's wife
 Don Gumersindo
 Don Valeriano
 Cástulo Pérez
 La Jerónima, the midwife
 The shoemaker ('El zapatero')

Symbols 

 The dark spot
 Mosén Millán's fatigue
 Owls
 Partridges - Since Don Juan Manuel's Tales of Count Lucanor, partridges have served in Spanish literature as symbols of deceit. In El Conde Lucanor itself they mark a necromancer's deception of a clergyman wishing to advance his career within the church. The necromancer offers the clergyman a dinner of partridges and promptly hypnotizes him into believing he ascends to the papacy in a matter of a few years. Therefore, partridges in this story may symbolize Millán's untrustworthiness, or his weakness in the face of persuasion, as we observe that Millán betrays almost unwittingly with a slight nod of the head.  
 Larks
 The colt
 The cave
 "Cojones" (slang, "testicles") - La Jerónima's dialogue informs us that she knows based on changing Paco's diapers in his infancy that he is endowed with unusually large testicles, symbols of his masculinity and his courage. These sharply contrast with Millán's weak character.

Film
In 1985, Spanish film director Francesc Betriu adapted the novel into a film of the same name, starring Antonio Banderas as Paco. The film was nominated for the Golden Lion at the 42nd Venice International Film Festival.

References

20th-century Spanish novels
Novels set during the Spanish Civil War
1953 novels
1985 films
Catholic novels